The VTB United League Young Player of the Year is an annual VTB United League award given since the 2012–13 VTB United League season to the league's best young player. Players who are under age 23 are eligible.

Winners

 There was no awarding in the 2019–20, because the season was cancelled due to the coronavirus pandemic in Europe.

References

External links
 VTB United League Official Website 
 VTB United League Official Website 

Player